Arrecife is the capital city and a municipality of Lanzarote in the Canary Islands. It was made the island's capital in 1852. The city owes its name to the rock reef ("arrecife" being Spanish for "reef") which covers its local beach. It also gives its name to the nearby Arrecife Airport. The population of the municipality was 64,645 in 2020.

Arrecife is located south of Teguise and east of San Bartolomé, and is bordered by the Atlantic Ocean to its southeast. It is a port town, served by ferries to the other Canary Islands, Europe, and Africa. The LZ1 road connects Arrecife to the northeast of the island, the LZ2 road connects it to the southwest, and the LZ3 road serves as the city's beltway. The tallest building in Lanzarote is the Arrecife Gran Hotel, which is located on the seafront alongside the harbour.

History 
The earliest records of Arrecife date from the fifteenth century when it was a small fishing settlement. The name, given then as Arrecifes, refers to the black volcanic reefs behind which boats could hide, protected from sudden pirate attacks.

Towards the end of the sixteenth century the settlement began to grow in response to a need for accommodation and warehousing to support growing trade between the old and new worlds.  The first church was constructed at this time, consecrated to the first bishop of Arrecife, San Ginés. Growing prosperity increased the attractiveness of the town as a pirate target: in 1571 a pirate named Dogan plundered and almost completely destroyed the little port town.

In 1964 Arrecife became the site of Lanzarote's first sea-water desalination plant.

Climate 
Lanzarote has a marine desert climate according to the Köppen climatic classification. The little precipitation is concentrated in the winter months.

Historical population

Economy
The Port of Arrecife is the main port facility for Lanzarote and the second busiest in the Canary Islands in terms of passengers. It handles passenger ferries, cruise ships, and ro-ro cargo, but also bulk, breakbulk, containers, and liquid bulk, and has a large fishing port.

Communities 
 Urbanización Playa Honda (subdivision), south

Assets of Cultural Interest 
The real estate properties of Arrecife registered in the Register of Assets of Cultural Interest are:

 Casa de los Arroyo
 Castillo de San Gabriel
 Castillo de San José
 Iglesia Matriz de San Ginés Obispo
 Fachada del edificio Segarra
 Headquarter of the Island Council of Lanzarote
 Salinas de Naos
 Salinas de Bufona

Sites of interest 
 Playa Reducto, Arrecife's town beach
 Castillo de San José, 18th-century fortress that now houses a collection of modern art
 Puente de Las Bolas, bridge leading to the Castillo de San Gabriel
 Charco de San Ginés, man-made lagoon used by fishermen

Gallery

See also 
 List of municipalities in Las Palmas

References

External links 
 
 
 Things to do in Arrecife

 
Municipalities in Lanzarote
Populated places in Lanzarote